Mariel Espinosa Solís (born 24 January 1987 in Morelia, Michoacán) is a female track and field athlete from Mexico who specializes in the 400 and 800 metres competitions.

Espinosa is one of the current Mexican athletics record-holders in the women's 4 × 800 metres relay since May 2014.

References

External links

1987 births
Living people
Mexican female sprinters
Mexican female middle-distance runners
Sportspeople from Michoacán
Sportspeople from Morelia
Central American and Caribbean Games silver medalists for Mexico
Competitors at the 2014 Central American and Caribbean Games
Central American and Caribbean Games medalists in athletics